An entertainment system is a system of entertainment usually of electronic components that handle audio and video, video gaming, computers, etc.

More specifically, an entertainment system may refer to:

 Home theater system
 Home theater PC
 In-car entertainment
 In-flight entertainment
 Video game console